A ground-effect vehicle (GEV), also called a wing-in-ground-effect (WIG), ground-effect craft, wingship, flarecraft or ekranoplan, is a vehicle that is able to move over the surface by gaining support from the reactions of the air against the surface of the earth or water. Typically, it is designed to glide over a level surface (usually over the sea) by making use of ground effect, the aerodynamic interaction between the moving wing and the surface below. Some models can operate over any flat area such as frozen lakes or flat plains similar to a hovercraft.

Design

A ground-effect vehicle needs some forward velocity to produce lift dynamically, and the principal benefit of operating a wing in ground effect is to reduce its lift-dependent drag. The basic design principle is that the closer the wing operates to an external surface such as the ground, when it is said to be in ground effect, the less drag it feels.

An airfoil passing through air increases air pressure on the underside, while decreasing pressure across the top. The high and low pressures are maintained until they flow off the ends of the wings, where they form vortices which in turn are the major cause of lift-induced drag—normally a significant portion of the drag affecting an aircraft. The greater the span of a wing, the less induced drag created for each unit of lift and the greater the efficiency of the particular wing. This is the primary reason gliders have long wings.

Placing the same wing near a surface such as the water or the ground has the effect of increasing the aspect ratio, but without having the complications associated with a long and slender wing, so that the short stubs on a GEV can produce just as much lift as the much larger wing on a transport aircraft, though it can do this only when close to the earth's surface. Once sufficient speed has built up, some GEVs may be capable of leaving ground effect and functioning as normal aircraft until they approach their destination. The distinguishing characteristic is that they are unable to land or take off without a significant amount of help from the ground effect cushion, and cannot climb until they have reached a much higher speed.

A GEV is sometimes characterized as a transition between a hovercraft and an aircraft, although this is not correct as a hovercraft is statically supported upon a cushion of pressurized air from an onboard downward-directed fan. Some GEV designs, such as the Russian Lun and Dingo, have used forced blowing under the wing by auxiliary engines to increase the high pressure area under the wing to assist the takeoff; however they differ from hovercraft in still requiring forward motion to generate sufficient lift to fly.

Although the GEV may look similar to the seaplane and share many technical characteristics, it is generally not designed to fly out of ground effect. It differs from the hovercraft in lacking low-speed hover capability in much the same way that a fixed-wing airplane differs from the helicopter. Unlike the hydrofoil, it does not have any contact with the surface of the water when in "flight". The ground-effect vehicle constitutes a unique class of transportation.

The Boston-based (United States) company REGENT proposed an electric-powered high-wing design with a standard hull for water operations, but also incorporated fore- and aft-mounted hydrofoil units designed to lift the craft out of the water during takeoff run, to facilitate lower liftoff speeds.

Wing configurations

Straight wing
Used by the Russian Rostislav Alexeyev for his ekranoplan. The wings are significantly shorter than those of comparable aircraft, and this configuration requires a high aft-placed horizontal tail to maintain stability. The pitch and altitude stability comes from the lift slope difference between a front low wing in ground-effect (commonly the main wing) and an aft, higher-located second wing nearly out of ground-effect (generally named a stabilizer).

Reverse-delta wing
Developed by Alexander Lippisch, this wing allows stable flight in ground-effect through self-stabilization. This is the main Class B form of GEV.

Tandem wings
Tandem wings can have three configurations:
 A biplane-style type-1 utilising a shoulder-mounted main lift wing and belly-mounted sponsons similar to those on combat and transport helicopters.
 A canard-style type-2 with a mid-size horizontal wing near the nose of the craft directing airflow under the main lift airfoil. This type-2 tandem design is a major improvement during takeoff, as it creates an air cushion to lift the craft above the water at a lower speed, thereby reducing water drag, which is the biggest obstacle to successful seaplane launches.
 Two stubby wings as in the tandem-airfoil flairboat produced by Günther Jörg in Germany. His particular design is self-stabilizing longitudinally.

Advantages and disadvantages

Given similar hull size and power, and depending on its specific design, the lower lift-induced drag of a GEV, as compared to an aircraft of similar capacity, will improve its fuel efficiency and, up to a point, its speed. GEVs are also much faster than surface vessels of similar power, because they avoid drag from the water.

On the water the aircraft-like construction of GEVs increases the risk of damage in collisions with surface objects. Furthermore, the limited number of egress points make it more difficult to evacuate the vehicle in an emergency.

Since most GEVs are designed to operate from water, accidents and engine failure typically are less hazardous than in a land-based aircraft, but the lack of altitude control leaves the pilot with fewer options for avoiding collision, and to some extent that negates such benefits. Low altitude brings high-speed craft into conflict with ships, buildings and rising land, which may not be sufficiently visible in poor conditions to avoid. GEVs may be unable to climb over or turn sharply enough to avoid collisions, while drastic, low-level maneuvers risk contact with solid or water hazards beneath. Aircraft can climb over most obstacles, but GEVs are more limited.

In high winds, take-off must be into the wind, which takes the craft across successive lines of waves, causing heavy pounding, stressing the craft and creating an uncomfortable ride. In light winds, waves may be in any direction, which can make control difficult as each wave causes the vehicle to both pitch and roll. The lighter construction of GEVs makes their ability to operate in higher sea states less than that of conventional ships, but greater than the ability of hovercraft or hydrofoils, which are closer to the water surface. The demise of the conventional seaplane was a result of its inability to operate in rough sea conditions even while flying conditions were good, and its use lasted only until runways were more commonly available. GEVs are similarly limited.

Like conventional aircraft, greater power is needed for takeoff, and, like seaplanes, ground-effect vehicles must get on the step before they can accelerate to flight speed. Careful design, usually with multiple redesigns of hullforms, is required to get this right, which increases engineering costs. This obstacle is more difficult for GEVs with short production runs to overcome. For the vehicle to work, its hull needs to be stable enough longitudinally to be controllable yet not so stable that it cannot lift off the water.

The bottom of the vehicle must be formed to avoid excessive pressures on landing and taking off without sacrificing too much lateral stability, and it must not create too much spray, which damages the airframe and the engines. The Russian ekranoplans show evidence of fixes for these problems in the form of multiple chines on the forward part of the hull undersides and in the forward location of the jet engines.

Finally, limited utility has kept production levels low enough that it has been impossible to amortize development costs sufficiently to make GEVs competitive with conventional aircraft.

A 2014 study by students at NASA's Ames Research Center claims that use of GEVs for passenger travel could lead to cheaper flights, increased accessibility and less pollution.

Classification
One obstacle to GEV development is the classification and legislation to be applied. The International Maritime Organization has studied the application of rules based on the International Code of Safety for High-Speed Craft (HSC code) which was developed for fast ships such as hydrofoils, hovercraft, catamarans and the like. The Russian Rules for classification and construction of small type A ekranoplans is a document upon which most GEV design is based. However, in 2005, the IMO classified the WISE or GEV under the category of ships.

The International Maritime Organization recognizes three types of GEVs:

At the time of writing, those classes only applied to craft carrying 12 passengers or more, and (as of 2019) there was disagreement between national regulatory agencies about whether these vehicles should be classified, and regulated, as aircraft or as boats.

History

By the 1920s, the ground effect phenomenon was well-known, as pilots found that their airplanes appeared to become more efficient as they neared the runway surface during landing. In 1934 the US National Advisory Committee for Aeronautics issued Technical Memorandum 771, Ground Effect on the Takeoff and Landing of Airplanes, which was a translation into English of a summary of French research on the subject. The French author Maurice Le Sueur had added a suggestion based on this phenomenon: "Here the imagination of inventors is offered a vast field. The ground interference reduces the power required for level flight in large proportions, so here is a means of rapid and at the same time economic locomotion: Design an airplane which is always within the ground-interference zone. At first glance this apparatus is dangerous because the ground is uneven and the altitude called skimming permits no freedom of maneuver. But on large-sized aircraft, over water, the question may be attempted ..."

By the 1960s, the technology started maturing, in large part due to the independent contributions of Rostislav Alexeyev in the Soviet Union and German Alexander Lippisch, working in the United States. Alexeyev worked from his background as a ship designer whereas Lippisch worked as an aeronautical engineer. The influence of Alexeyev and Lippisch remains noticeable in most GEVs seen today.

Soviet Union

Led by Alexeyev, the Soviet Central Hydrofoil Design Bureau was the center of ground-effect craft development in the USSR. The military potential for such a craft was soon recognized, and Alexeyev received support and financial resources from Soviet leader Nikita Khrushchev.

Some manned and unmanned prototypes were built, ranging up to eight tonnes in displacement. This led to the development of a 550-tonne military ekranoplan of  length. The craft was dubbed the Caspian Sea Monster by U.S. intelligence experts, after a huge, unknown craft was spotted on satellite reconnaissance photos of the Caspian Sea area in the 1960s. With its short wings, it looked airplane-like in planform, but would probably be incapable of flight.

The Soviet ekranoplan program continued with the support of Minister of Defence Dmitriy Ustinov. It produced the most successful ekranoplan so far, the 125-tonne A-90 Orlyonok. These craft were originally developed as high-speed military transports and were usually based on the shores of the Caspian Sea and Black Sea. The Soviet Navy ordered 120 Orlyonok-class ekranoplans, but this figure was later reduced to fewer than 30 vessels, with planned deployment mainly in the Black Sea and Baltic Sea fleets.

A few Orlyonoks served with the Soviet Navy from 1979 to 1992. In 1987, the 400-tonne Lun-class ekranoplan was built as an anti-ship missile launch platform. A second Lun, renamed Spasatel, was laid down as a rescue vessel, but was never finished. The two major problems that the Soviet ekranoplans faced were poor longitudinal stability and a need for reliable navigation.

Minister Ustinov died in 1984, and the new Minister of Defence, Marshal Sokolov, cancelled funding for the program. Only three operational Orlyonok-class ekranoplans (with revised hull design) and one Lun-class ekranoplan remained at a naval base near Kaspiysk.

Since the dissolution of the Soviet Union, ekranoplans have been produced by the Volga Shipyard in Nizhniy Novgorod. Smaller ekranoplans for non-military use have been under development. The CHDB had already developed the eight-seat Volga-2 in 1985, and Technologies and Transport is developing a smaller version called the Amphistar. Beriev proposed a large craft of the type, the Be-2500, as a "flying ship" cargo carrier, but nothing came of the project.

Germany

Lippisch Type and Hanno Fischer

In Germany, Lippisch was asked to build a very fast boat for American businessman Arthur A. Collins. In 1963 Lippisch developed the X-112, a revolutionary design with reversed delta wing and T-tail. This design proved to be stable and efficient in ground effect, and even though it was successfully tested, Collins decided to stop the project and sold the patents to the German company Rhein Flugzeugbau (RFB), which further developed the inverse delta concept into the X-113 and the six-seat X-114. These craft could be flown out of ground effect so that, for example, peninsulas could be overflown.

Hanno Fischer took over the works from RFB and created his own company, Fischer Flugmechanik, which eventually completed two models. The Airfisch 3 carried two persons, and the FS-8 carried six persons. The FS-8 was to be developed by Fischer Flugmechanik for a Singapore-Australian joint venture called Flightship. Powered by a V8 Chevrolet automobile engine rated at 337 kW, the prototype made its first flight in February 2001 in the Netherlands. The company no longer exists but the prototype craft was bought by Wigetworks, a company based in Singapore and renamed as AirFish 8. In 2010, that vehicle was registered as a ship in the Singapore Registry of Ships.

The University of Duisburg-Essen is supporting an ongoing research project to develop the Hoverwing.

Günther Jörg-type tandem-airfoil flairboat

German engineer Günther Jörg, who had worked on Alexeyev's first designs and was familiar with the challenges of GEV design, developed a GEV with two wings in a tandem arrangement, the Jörg-II. It was the third, manned, tandem-airfoil boat, named "Skimmerfoil", which was developed during his consultancy period in South Africa. It was a simple and low-cost design of a first 4-seater tandem-airfoil flairboat completely constructed of aluminium. The prototype was in the SAAF Port Elizabeth Museum from 4 July 2007 until 2013, and is now in private use. Pictures of the museum show the boat after a period of some years outside the museum and without protection against the sun.

The consultancy of Dipl. Ing. Günther Jörg, a specialist and insider of German airplane industry from 1963 and a colleague of Alexander Lippisch and Hanno Fischer, was founded with a fundamental knowledge of wing in ground effect physics, as well as results of fundamental tests under different conditions and designs having begun in 1960. For over 30 years, Jörg built and tested 15 different tandem-airfoil flairboats in different sizes and made of different materials.

The following tandem-airfoil flairboat (TAF) types had been built after a previous period of nearly 10 years of research and development:
 TAB VII-3: First manned tandem W.I.G type Jörg, being built at Technical University of Darmstadt, Akaflieg
 TAF VII-5: Second manned tandem-airfoil Flairboat, 2 seater made of wood
 TAF VIII-1: 2-seater tandem-airfoil flairboat built of glass-reinforced plastic (GRP) and aluminium. A small serie of 6 Flairboats had been produced by former Botec Company
 TAF VIII-2: 4-seater tandem-airfoil Flairboat built of full aluminium (2 units) and built of GRP (3 units)
 TAF VIII-3: 8-seater tandem-airfoil Flairboat built of aluminium combined with GRP parts
 TAF VIII-4: 12-seater tandem-airfoil Flairboat built of aluminium combined with GRP parts
 TAF VIII-3B: 6-seater tandem-airfoil flairboat under carbon fibre composite construction

Bigger concepts are: 25-seater, 32-seater, 60-seater, 80-seater and bigger up to the size of a passenger airplane.

Those tandem-airfoil flairboats are registered as motorboat and classified as type A WIG. In 1984, Jörg received the "Philip Morris Award" for future transportation. In 1987, the Botec Company was founded. After his death in 2010, the company continued under his daughter and former assistant Ingrid Schellhaas with her company Tandem WIG Consulting.

1980–1999
Since the 1980s GEVs have been primarily smaller craft designed for the recreational and civilian ferry markets. Germany, Russia and the United States have provided most of the activity with some development in Australia, China, Japan, Korea and Taiwan. In these countries and regions, small craft with up to ten seats have been built. Other larger designs such as ferries and heavy transports have been proposed but have not been carried to completion.

Besides the development of appropriate design and structural configuration, automatic control and navigation systems have been developed. These include altimeters with high accuracy for low altitude flight and lesser dependence on weather conditions. "Phase radio altimeters" have become the choice for such applications beating laser altimeter, isotropic or ultrasonic altimeters.

With Russian consultation, the United States Defense Advanced Research Projects Agency (DARPA) studied the Aerocon Dash 1.6 wingship.

Universal Hovercraft developed a flying hovercraft, first flying a prototype in 1996. Since 1999, the company has offered plans, parts, kits and manufactured ground effect hovercraft called the Hoverwing.

2000- 
Iran deployed three squadrons of Bavar 2 two-seat GEVs in September 2010. This GEV carries one machine gun and surveillance gear, and incorporates features to reduce its radar signature. In October 2014, satellite images showed the GEV in a shipyard in southern Iran. The GEV has two engines and no armament.

In Singapore, Wigetworks obtained certification from Lloyd's Register for entry into class. On 31 March 2011, AirFish 8-001 became one of the first GEVs to be flagged with the Singapore Registry of Ships, one of the largest ship registries. Wigetworks partnered with National University of Singapore's Engineering Department to develop higher capacity GEVs.

Burt Rutan in 2011 and Korolev in 2015 showed GEV projects.

In Korea, Wing Ship Technology Corporation developed and tested a 50-seat passenger GEV named the WSH-500. in 2013

Estonian transport company Sea Wolf Express planned to launch passenger service in 2019 between Helsinki and Tallinn, a distance of 87 km taking only half an hour, using a Russian-built ekranoplan. The company ordered 15 ekranoplans with maximum speed of 185 km/h and capacity of 12 passengers, built by Russian RDC Aqualines.

In 2021 Brittany Ferries announced that they were looking into using REGENT (Regional Electric Ground Effect Naval Transport) ground effect craft "seagliders" for cross English Channel services. Southern Airways Express also placed firm orders for seagliders with intent to operate them along Florida's east coast.

Around mid-2022, the Pentagon’s Defense Advanced Research Projects Agency (DARPA) launched its Liberty Lifter project, with the goal of creating a long-range, low-cost transport using the ekranoplan concept. The challenge is to carry 100 tons over 7,500 km, operate at sea without ground-based maintenance, all using low-cost materials.

See also
 Aerodynamically alleviated marine vehicle
 Ground effect (aerodynamics)
 Ground-effect train
 List of ground-effect vehicles
 Surface effect ship
 Caspian Sea Monster

Footnotes

Notes

Citations

Bibliography

.

External links
 

Amphibious vehicles
Aircraft configurations
Ekranoplan
Soviet inventions